The Napa Valley Museum is a museum in Yountville, California.

The museum features exhibits on the history, culture, environment of Napa Valley as well as the creative expressions of regional and local artists.

In 2021 the museum mounted an exhibition titled Dangerous Games: Dangerous Toys We Loved As Kids. The show included science kits containing radioactive materials, darts, and toys made from glass. Also in 2021, the museum presented the show, Kitchen Gizmos & Gadgets from the Kathleen Hill Culinary Collection. The show displayed "bizarre and noteworthy foodie apparatuses" as well as utensils and historical kitchen tools.

References

External links 
 

1972 establishments in California
Museums in Napa County, California
Yountville, California
Museums established in 1972